Bir Maona also known as Bir Ma'una is a location in Saudi Arabia. The Expedition of Bir Maona took place here where 70 Muslim were killed. It used to be a well at the time 

Bir Maona is mentioned in the Sunni hadith collection Sahih Bukhari, as follows:

According to Mubarakpuri, Quran 3:169-173 is also related to the Bir Maona, and the verse was later abrogated.

See also
List of battles of Muhammad

References

Populated places in Mecca Province